The Sir George-Étienne Cartier Monument is a monument in Montreal, Quebec, in the Mount Royal Park to George-Étienne Cartier by sculptor George William Hill (1862–1934).

The monument, which is topped by a winged Goddess of Liberty, was inaugurated on September 6, 1919 in the heart of Fletcher's Field west side. In temperate months it is the site of free weekly drum circle festivals informally called Tam-Tams.

On the front, or East side of the monument, George-Étienne Cartier is portrayed standing above four other figures, each one representing a Province that signed the Canadian Confederation of 1867. 

On the North side of the monument, a woman with a young girl to her right and a young boy to her left is shown holding a sword in her left hand. The boy holds out his bonded wrists in a begging manner as the girl reads a book. This scene represents Legislation.

On the South side, in a similar scene to the North side, a woman sits in the middle of a young boy who is holding a globe and a young girl who is reading a book. This represents Cartier's important contributions in education.

Gallery

References

External links 
  
 Montreal Public Art Bureau - 
  
  

1919 in Canada
George-Étienne Cartier
History of Montreal
Liberty symbols
Monuments and memorials in Montreal
Mount Royal
Outdoor sculptures in Montreal
1919 sculptures
Sculptures of children in Canada
Books in art
1919 establishments in Quebec
Cultural depictions of Canadian men
Cultural depictions of politicians
Statues of politicians